Adrian Richard Owers (born 26 February 1965 in Chelmsford, England) is a former professional footballer who played in The Football League for Southend United, Brighton & Hove Albion, Gillingham and Maidstone United.

In 2009, he was called upon to play for England in FIFA's Senior World Cup.

References

1965 births
Living people
Association football midfielders
Sportspeople from Chelmsford
English footballers
Southend United F.C. players
Chelmsford City F.C. players
Brighton & Hove Albion F.C. players
Gillingham F.C. players
Maidstone United F.C. (1897) players
Dagenham & Redbridge F.C. players
English Football League players